Haw Par may refer to:
 Aw Boon Haw and Aw Boon Par brothers
 Building complex related to the brothers
Tiger Balm Gardens, known in Chinese language as Haw Par Villa and Haw Par Mansion
 Haw Par Corporation Limited, Singapore listed company, formerly known as Haw Par Brothers International Limited
 Haw Par Brothers (Private) Limited, a Singapore private company that was owned by Aw family